was a prefectural junior college in Niigata, Niigata, Japan, established in 1963. The school was closed on March 31, 2012, and the school buildings were succeeded by the University of Niigata Prefecture (established in April 2009).

History 
The college was founded in April 1963 with one department: the Department of Domestic Science. In 1966 two departments were added: the Departments of English and Early Childhood Education. In 1993 the Department of International Studies was added, and the former Department of Domestic Science was renamed Department of Human Life and Environmental Science.

Organization 
Associate degree courses (2-year)
 Department of Human Life and Environmental Science
 Courses: Human Environmental Science, Food & Nutrition, and Social Welfare
 Department of Early Childhood Education
 Department of English
 Department of International Studies
 Courses: Russian, Chinese, and Korean
Advanced courses (2-year; accredited by the NIAD-UE)
 Advanced Course of Food and Nutrition Science

References

External links 
  
 English website (archived on August 6, 2007)

Educational institutions established in 1963
Public universities in Japan
Universities and colleges in Niigata Prefecture
Japanese junior colleges
1963 establishments in Japan
Women's universities and colleges in Japan
Educational institutions disestablished in 2012